"Heaven Knows" is a song by British band When in Rome, released in 1988 as the second single from their self-titled debut album. The song was written by all three band members Clive Farrington, Andrew Mann, and Michael Floreale, and produced by Richard James Burgess. The song peaked at No. 95 on the U.S. Billboard Hot 100 chart and No. 14 on the Hot Dance Club Play chart.

Chart performance

References

1988 songs
1988 singles
1989 singles
When in Rome (band) songs
Song recordings produced by Richard James Burgess
Virgin Records singles